The MSU Mankato women’s ice hockey program attempted to qualify for the NCAA Tournament for the first time in school history. Ultimately failing, winning only seven games.

Recruiting
May 7, 2010: Head coach Eric Means announced that the Mavericks have recruited ten players.

Regular season
Kathleen Rogan registered a hat trick as the Mavericks defeated No. 6-ranked North Dakota by a 4-2 margin. This was the Mavericks first hat trick since Ashley Young registered one against Bemidji State in 2008.
Nov. 5-6: Nina Tikkinen accumulated five points as the Mavericks won back-to-back conference games against St. Cloud State.  Tikkinen had three points on November 5.  The three points were all assists on Minnesota State’s first three scores, including teammate Kathleen Rogan’s game-winning goal in the first period. The following day, Tikkinen gave the Mavericks a 2-0 lead midway through the second period. The two victories gave MSU their first home ice series sweep since Oct. 31-Nov. 1, 2008 when they beat Bemidji State.
November 12–13: Nina Tikkinen produced a four-goal, five-point series as the Mavericks won twice on the road against league rival Ohio State. For her efforts, she was named WCHA Player of the Week for the second straight time. Tikkinen had two goals and one assist for three points as MSU won by a 5-3 tally on November 12. Both of her goals tied the game (2-2 in the second period, 3-3 in the third). On November 13, she broke a 3-3 tie with a game-winning goal with only 3:45 left. Tikkinen now has a four-game winning streak. It also marked her second straight five-point weekend.
November 12–13: Minnesota State University forward Kathleen Rogan had a goal and three assists for four points as the visiting Mavericks took back-to-back league victories from Ohio State. She had two points in each game. She earned an assist on the game-tying goal on November 12. She would register two assists on November 13 and finish the series with a +3 plus/minus rating. After the series, she became the Mavericks leading scorer with fourteen points (seven goals and seven assists).

Standings

Schedule

Conference record

Awards and honors
Kathleen Rogan, WCHA Rookie of the Week (week of October 27)
Kathleen Rogan, WCHA Rookie of the Week, (Week of November 17) 
Nina Tikkinen, WCHA Offensive Player of the Week (Week of November 10)
Nina Tikkinen, WCHA Player of the Week, (Week of November 17)

See also
2009–10 MSU–Mankato Mavericks women's ice hockey season

References

M
M
Minnesota State Mavericks women's ice hockey seasons